Trisopterus capelanus is a fish species belonging to the cod family (Gadidae). It is found in the Mediterranean Sea.

The taxonomic status of Trisopterus capelanus has until recently been unclear, and it has been mostly considered to be a subspecies of Trisopterus minutus. However, genetic and morphometric analyses clearly support the status of Trisopterus capelanus as a separate species. In fact, Trisopterus capelanus is more closely related to Trisopterus luscus than to T. minutus.

References

Gadidae
Fish described in 1800
Fish of the Mediterranean Sea
Taxa named by Bernard Germain de Lacépède